USS L. A. Dempsey (SP-1231) was a United States Navy armed tug that was in commission as a patrol vessel from 1917 to 1919.

L. A. Dempsey was built as the commercial tug Mascot in 1890 in Philadelphia, Pennsylvania. She later was renamed L. A. Dempsey. On 13 September 1917, the U.S. Navy acquired her from her owner, Dempsey & Son of Norfolk, Virginia, for use as a section patrol boat during World War I. She was commissioned as USS L. A. Dempsey (SP-1231).

Assigned to the 5th Naval District and based at Norfolk, L. A. Dempsey served as a section patrol boat for the rest of World War I and into 1919.

The Navy decommissioned L. A. Dempsey on 11 July 1919 and returned her to Dempsey & Son the same day.

References

SP-1231 L. A. Dempsey at Department of the Navy Naval History and Heritage Command Online Library of Selected Images: U.S. Navy Ships -- Listed by Hull Number "SP" #s and "ID" #s -- World War I Era Patrol Vessels and other Acquired Ships and Craft numbered from SP-1200 through SP-1299
NavSource Online: Section Patrol Craft Photo Archive L. A. Dempsey (SP 1231)

Tugs of the United States Navy
Patrol vessels of the United States Navy
World War I patrol vessels of the United States
Ships built in Philadelphia
1890 ships